Wenchi is a town and is the capital of Wenchi Municipal of the Bono Region in middle-belt of Ghana. Wenchi is located at 7.73333 [latitude in decimal degrees], -2.1 [longitude in decimal degrees] at an average elevation/altitude of 304 meters. Wenchi is approximately 30 km north of Techiman and about 50 km east of the Ivory Coast border. Wenchi has a population of 39,187 people in 2013.

Transport
Wenchi is connected by road to Techiman and Sunyani and its airport, Sunyani Airport.  Wenchi is not serviced by a railway station on the Ghana Railway Corporation, but it has been proposed that a line be extended to Wenchi.
It has less vehicular traffic as few people own cars and motors.

Culture
Wenchi celebrates the annual Apoo, a yam festival in April/May. The climax of the Apoo is the durbar of the king (Omanhene) through Wenchi. In August, the annual yam festival takes place in Wenchi and it marks the end of the first rainy season and harvesting of the yam in the towns of Wenchi and Techiman. In 2019, the Omanhemaa (Queen) of Wenchi was Nana Ntoa Sramangyadua III.

Sports
The inhabitants of Wenchi are sports fanatics; many residents follow several Wenchi-based sports teams. Current second division team is Wenchiman. The team Unity Sporting Club, a sports academy, is located in Wenchi.

Education 
Wenchi Methodist Senior High School

Notable people
Wenchi is the hometown and birthplace of former Ghanaian prime minister Kofi Abrefa Busia, who was born a prince of and is buried there. There is a  street named after him, Busia Street. His sister Ama Bame Busia, a former member of council of state, is his only living sibling. Professor George Baffour Gyan is the current MP and minister of planning at the presidency.

References 

 Wenchi Municipal

External links 
 Wess
 Unity Sporting Club
 Viglosam Lodge
 

Populated places in the Bono Region